Tobias Simpson Menzies (born 7 March 1974) is an English stage, television and film actor. He is known for playing Prince Philip, Duke of Edinburgh in the third and fourth seasons of Netflix's series The Crown, for which he won the Primetime Emmy Award for Outstanding Supporting Actor in a Drama Series and received Golden Globe and British Academy Television Award nominations. Menzies also played Frank and Jonathan "Black Jack" Randall in STARZ's Outlander, for which he received a Golden Globe Award nomination, in addition to his roles as Brutus in HBO's Rome and Edmure Tully in HBO's Game of Thrones.

Early years
Menzies was born in Hammersmith, London, England, the son of Peter Menzies and Gillian (née Simpson). His mother was a teacher and his father a BBC radio producer. He has one younger brother, Luke, who is a solicitor. Menzies attended the Perry Court Rudolf Steiner School in Canterbury, Kent, where he was trained in the Steiner System, which includes movement, singing and instrumental music. Then he attended the Frensham Heights School, near Farnham in Surrey, at the same time as Hattie Morahan and Jim Sturgess. 

Menzies attended Deborah Moody's Year Out Drama Company in Stratford-Upon-Avon from 1993 to 1994 before enrolling in the Royal Academy of Dramatic Art, eventually graduating with a BA Degree in Acting (1998). Upon completion of his BA, Menzies participated in improvisation workshops through The Spontaneity Shop, a British improvisation comedy company, as part of a graduate scheme through RADA.

Career

Television
Menzies' first professional television role, beginning in 1998, was an eleven-episode stint on BBC's long-running medical drama Casualty. Then he featured in director David Attwood's made-for-TV film Summer in the Suburbs and a series-three episode of ITV's crime drama Midsomer Murders. In 2002 Menzies portrayed Vince in ITV's romantic comedy series I Saw You, appeared in three episodes of SAS drama Ultimate Force and featured in a series-one episode of WWII drama Foyle's War. He also appeared in made-for-television film A Very Social Secretary, directed by Jon Jones, which launched UK Channel 4's spin-off station, More4.

From 2005 to 2007 Menzies portrayed Marcus Junius Brutus, Julius Caesar's friend and later co-assassin, in the HBO/BBC historical drama series Rome (2005–07). He next appeared as William Elliot in ITV's production of Jane Austen's classic Persuasion and Derrick Sington in Channel 4's feature-length drama The Relief of Belsen, which chronicled the British liberation of Bergen-Belsen Concentration Camp at the end of WWII. In 2008 Menzies starred in two stylistically different mini-series. The first was BBC's anthology mini-series Fairy Tales, in an episode entitled The Empress's New Clothes, where he portrayed Aidee. Second was the series finale of BBC's Bonekickers, which followed a team of British archaeologists as they investigated mysteries and conspiracy theories surrounding historical artifacts. The next year saw Menzies return to episodic television with roles in ITV's legal drama Kingdom, alongside Stephen Fry, a special episode of BBC's comedy Pulling and several episodes of BBC One's spy drama Spooks.

The Deep, BBC's 2010 science fiction-thriller mini-series set on submarines in the deep waters below Arctic ice, saw Menzies co-star alongside Minnie Driver and James Nesbitt. That same year he portrayed real-life Naval Intelligence officer Ian Fleming in PBS's mini-series Any Human Heart, an adaptation of William Boyd's 2012 novel, which chronicled historical events through fictional protagonist Logan Mountstuart. He would go on to feature in a series four episode of ITV's Law & Order: UK, a British adaptation of Dick Wolf's long-running American procedural franchise. In 2011, Menzies featured as tabloid journalist Ross McGovern in BBC Two's seven part mini-series The Shadow Line, opposite Stephen Rea and Chiwetel Ejiofor. The next year, in ITV's supernatural courtroom drama Eternal Law, Menzies portrayed a fallen angel who had become a prosecuting attorney in York, England. He would go on to feature in an episode of BBC Two's political satire The Thick of It, an episode of Channel 4's political thriller mini-series Secret State, three episodes of BBC's medical satire Getting On, and two episodes of BBC's Shakespearean documentary Simon Schama's Shakespeare.

In 2013 Menzies first appeared as Edmure Tully, the heir to House Tully of Riverrun, in HBO's Game of Thrones, which was based upon George R. R. Martin's fantasy book series. The role was recurring, with Menzies' final appearance occurring in the 2019 series finale. That same year, Menzies starred in the series two finale of Channel 4's anthology series Black Mirror, and a two episode stint on BBC's long-running crime drama Silent Witness. 2014 saw Menzies portray Maggie Gyllenhaal's bodyguard, Nathaniel Bloom, in the BBC's Emmy nominated mini-series The Honourable Woman, and Alexander in the series premier of BBC's dog training comedy Puppy Love. The same year, Menzies first appeared in Starz's time travel drama series, Outlander, which is based upon author Diana Gabaldon's best-selling series of novels. He portrayed the recurring dual roles of Frank Randall, a 20th-century historian, and Jonathan "Black Jack" Randall, his brutal 18th-century ancestor. From 2015 to 2019, Menzies appeared in the recurring role of Dr. Harries, OB/GYN to lead character Sharon, in Amazon's original series Catastrophe.

BBC One's adaptation of John le Carré's espionage novel The Night Manager saw Menzies, opposite Tom Hiddleston and Hugh Laurie, in the role of British intelligence director Geoffrey Dromgoole in the spring of 2016. That same year, he starred in Channel 4's series pilot The Circuit, a comedy set at a neighborhood dinner party. In 2017, in his first voice over work on television, Menzies portrayed Mandalorian warrior Tiber Saxon on Disney XD's animated series Star Wars Rebels. It was announced in 2016 that Menzies had been cast as James Fitzjames,  Captain of the Royal Navy vessel HMS Erebus, in AMC's anthology series The Terror. The series, based upon Dan Simmons' 2007 novel of the same name, chronicled a fictionalized account of real-life expeditionary ships HMS Erebus and HMS Terror during the third Franklin Expedition of the Arctic in 1848. That same year, he appeared as the Duke of Cornwall in BBC Two's adaptation of Shakespeare's tragedy King Lear, opposite Anthony Hopkins and Emily Watson.

In March 2018 it was announced that Menzies had been cast to portray Prince Philip, the Duke of Edinburgh, in seasons three and four of Netflix's hit series The Crown opposite Olivia Colman as Queen Elizabeth II. Menzies was announced, in June 2019, as a cast member for the Channel 4/Hulu original series This Way Up, a comedy set around the life of an English as a Second/Foreign Language (ESL/EFL) teacher, from actress and writer Aisling Bea. In January 2022, he was set to lead limited drama series Manhunt created by Monica Beletsky, based on the book Manhunt: The 12-Day Chase for Lincoln’s Killer by James Swanson.

Film
Menzies' first professional film role was 2000's dramatic comedy The Low Down, opposite Aidan Gillen, which premiered at the Locarno Film Festival. His next role, in Miramax's 2004 biographical drama Finding Neverland, saw Menzies feature opposite Johnny Depp's J.M. Barrie, the creator of beloved children's character Peter Pan. The next year, Menzies appeared in the romantic comedy Piccadilly Jim, opposite Sam Rockwell, and director Adrian Shergold's drama Pierrepoint: The Last Hangman, opposite Timothy Spall. He also featured in Casino Royale, Columbia Pictures' 2006 reboot of the James Bond film franchise, as personal aide to M, chief of British secret intelligence agency Mi6.

In 2007, Menzies portrayed a Naval officer on the beaches of Normandy, opposite James McAvoy, in the Academy Award nominated adaptation of Ian McEwan's WWII drama Atonement. The Rose Theatre, an Elizabethan theatre outside London, produced a short video which was shown in 2009, and featured Menzies in the role of Mephistophilis, in Christopher Marlow's play Doctor Faustus. He would go on to appear in three films in 2010. The first was Independent Pictures' adaptation of Russian author Anton Chekhov's The Duel, where he portrayed Von Koren. Second was Swipe Films' production of Jackboots on Whitehall, an animated film featuring puppets. Menzies, alongside Alan Cumming and Timothy Spall, provided voice work for the comedy spoof, which explored the idea of Nazis invading the United Kingdom at the end of WWII. In his third film of 2010, Menzies starred opposite Genevieve O'Reilly in the drama Forget Me Not, an independent film which premiered at the Culver Plaza Theater in Culver City, CA. .

Dramatic comedy Hysteria (2011) featured Menzies, opposite Maggie Gyllenhaal and Hugh Dancy, in the story of the creation of the first Victorian era vibrator. That same year, he would feature in writer Andrew Steggall's short film The Door, an official selection at the 28th annual Warsaw International Film Festival, which was based upon the tale The Door in the Wall by H.G. Wells. In 2012, Menzies starred in director Carrie Cracknell's Nora, a short film inspired by the Young Vic's theatrical production of Henrik Ibsen's play A Doll's House. His next film was 2014's thriller The Birthday Gift, a short film which was screened at the Aesthetica Short Film Festival that year. Menzies would go on to star in the short film/micro-play Groove is in the Heart, a collaboration between the Royal Court Theatre and The Guardian which was screened at the London Film Festival, and submarine action film Black Sea, a modern-day pirate thriller, opposite Jude Law.

2016 saw Menzies feature in three films. First was director Benedict Andrews' forbidden relationship drama Una, which was based upon the play Blackbird from Scottish playwright David Harrower, followed by filmmaker James Hughes' experimental film The Velvet Abstract, which saw Menzies provide narration. Last was Underworld: Blood Wars, the fifth installment in the Underworld franchise, with Menzies starring as the main antagonist, Marius, opposite Kate Beckinsale's Selene.

In August 2017, it was announced that Menzies had been cast in director Emily Harris' adaptation of Carmilla, a fantasy film based upon the Gothic novella of the same name by Joseph Thomas Sheridan Le Fanu.

Theatre

Menzies' theatrical debut was in Hristo Boytchev's comedy The Colonel Bird, which ran at The Gate London in 1999. The next year, he featured in The Royal Exchange's presentation of The Way of the World, a production of playwright William Cosgreve's 1700s grandiloquent play of manners and Complicite theatre company's Light, an adaptation of author Torgny Lindgren's novel Ljuset (1987). In late 2001, Menzies appeared in Almeida Theatre's production of Anton Checkhov's play Platonov, an adaptation of the early, unnamed play that was Checkhov's first large scale drama. The next year, he portrayed Valentine in the Royal Theatre's production of Tom Stoppard's tragic comedy Arcadia.

Between 2003 and 2005, Menzies would co-star in the anti-war drama Serjeant Musgrave's Dance at the Everyman Theatre, and would portray the young teacher Irwin in Alan Bennett's The History Boys, which Nicholas Hytner directed at the Royal National Theatre. Of his role in The History Boys, one reviewer wrote:
He would go on to star in Michael Blakemore's West End production of Three Sisters, for which he was nominated for the Ian Charleson Award, and the title role in Rupert Goold's production of Hamlet, at the Royal Theatre, Northampton. Of his role in Hamlet, one reviewer wrote:

Menzies took on a supporting role in Playhouse Theatre's 2006 presentation of Pirandello's play As You Desire Me. The next year, he would feature in two productions. First was the role of Peter Trifimov in Chekhov's The Cherry Orchard at Sheffield's Crucible Theatre, followed by a turn as Harry Bagley in Almeida Theatre's production of Caryl Churchill's politically sexual comedy Cloud Nine. Late 2008 saw Menzies portray Edgar opposite Pete Postlethwaite in Liverpool Playhouse's production of King Lear, which continued with a run at London's Young Vic Theatre in early 2009.

In 2011, Menzies featured as Dr. Joseph Cardin, opposite Keira Knightley's Karen Wright, in Lillian Hellman's 1934 drama The Children's Hour, which focuses on the harmful effects of wrongful accusations and rumors. He would go on that same year to star in director Rupert Goold's Decade, a play presented through a series of short vignettes penned to mark the tenth anniversary of the September 11th attacks on the World Trade Center in New York City. George Farquhar's 1706 play The Recruiting Officer, which was based upon the methods used by the British Army to recruit troops during the War of Spanish Succession, saw Menzies star as Captain Plume during the first quarter of 2012. The next year, he would feature in director Carey Cracknell's Rough Cuts: Searched, at the Royal Court Theatre, and star in National Theatre's experimental play The Hush, which explored the connection between sound and memory.

Wallace Shawn's monologue play The Fever, which explored the main character's internal struggle with the morality of a privileged existence, saw Menzies perform to a micro audience at London's decadent May Fair Hotel in early 2015. Director Robert Icke purposely staged the play, produced by Almeida Theatre, at the May Fair Hotel in order to assist the small audience to better internalize its meaning. That same year, he would join an extensive cast for a sixteen-hour production of Homer's The Iliad, performed throughout the day at the British Museum and concluding at the Almeida Theatre, as well as being broadcast live. Working again with director Robert Icke, 2016 would see Menzies star in a modernised interpretation of Chekhov's Uncle Vanya prior to performing dramatic readings of selected sonnets by Shakespeare in Middle Temple Hall's choral programme The Dark Lady and the Tender Churl. Two years later, Menzies would return to the Almeida in their digital theatre production Figures of Speech, which highlighted performances of well known historical speeches. He appeared in series three of the project, which has featured artists such as Ian McKellen, Fiona Shaw, and Andrew Scott.

Early 2019 saw Menzies appear in the Gate Theatre's production of Sarah Ruhl's Dear, Elizabeth. The play, which dramatized letters between American poets Elizabeth Bishop and Robert Lowell, featured two different actors each night of the show's run. Later that year, Menzies starred in Almeida Theatre's production of The Hunt, which was set in Denmark and adapted from 2012's thriller film Jagten (The Hunt). The production ran from mid June to early August 2019. His performance garnered positive reviews, with one saying:

Radio
Menzies' first professional radio performance was 2010's drama A Nice Little Holiday, the story of British playwright John Osborne's 1961 besieged holiday in the South of France, which aired on BBC Radio 4 in September of that year. The next year, he would read an abridgement of Matthew Hollis' biography of poet and literary critic Edward Thomas, best known for his poem Adelstrop, on BBC Radio 4's series Book of the Week. In his third collaboration with BBC Radio 4, Menzies was the voice of John Charrington's Wedding (2012), the second episode of a five-part series titled Ghost Stories of E Nesbit. 2013's three-part radio drama, commissioned by BBC Radio 4, saw Menzies portray British writer and National Trust supporter James Lees-Milne, opposite Victoria Hamilton as novelist Nancy Mitford. The series consisted of three interconnected plays, based upon his WWII era journals, cataloging the decline of the English country house and titled Sometimes into the Arms of God, The Unending Battle, and What England Owes. That same year, he would star in BBC Radio 3's drama Serious Money, adapted for radio by Emma Harding from Caryl Churchill's play of the same name, and BBC Radio 4's political drama Every Duchess In England, based upon Parliament's response to England's financial crisis of 1931.

In 2014, Menzies featured in a five-part series for BBC Radio 4's Book of the Week where he read Laurie Lee's As I Walked Out One Midsummer Morning, an account of his travels in 1930s Spain, in sections released over a five-day period. He would go on the next year to star as Andy Warhol in Sarah Wooley's BBC Radio 4 drama Fifteen Minutes, opposite Adrian Rawlins, and a second five-part Book of the Week series where he, along with the author, would read British travel writer Robert Macfarlane's celebration of language, Landmarks. 2016 would see Menzies in another series which combined literary readings and music in an episode of BBC Radio 3's Words and Music series entitled Trapped. The episode explored both physical and mental entrapment with readings, including authors such as George Orwell and Charlotte Brontë, by both Menzies and Kate Phillips. He would also feature in BBC Radio 4's Comment Is Free, a political and social commentary focusing on a wife, portrayed by Rachael Stirling, who is forced to watch both the public and media eviscerate her husband's story.

Once again reading for BBC radio 4's series Book of the Week, Menzies narrated author Philip Hoare's exploration of our fascination with water and the sea in 2017's five-part RISINGTIDEFALLINGSTAR.

Acting credits

Television

Film

Theatre

Radio

Awards and nominations

References

External links 

 
 

1974 births
20th-century English male actors
21st-century English male actors
Alumni of RADA
English male film actors
English male Shakespearean actors
English male stage actors
English male television actors
English people of Scottish descent
Living people
Male actors from London
Outstanding Performance by a Supporting Actor in a Drama Series Primetime Emmy Award winners
People educated at Frensham Heights School